Vesicular pemphigoid is a cutaneous condition, a clinical variant of bullous pemphigoid, characterized by a dermatitis herpetiformis-like presentation with grouped small tense blisters.

See also 
 Bullosis diabeticorum
 List of cutaneous conditions

References 

Chronic blistering cutaneous conditions